Eucalyptus planchoniana, commonly known as the needlebark stringybark or bastard tallowwood is a species of small to medium-sized tree that is endemic to eastern Australia. It has rough, stringy bark on the trunk and larger branches, lance-shaped to curved adult leaves, flower buds in groups of seven, white flowers and cup-shaped, cylindrical or barrel-shaped fruit.

Description
It has rough, reddish, often prickly, stringy bark on the trunk and larger branches. Flowering occurs from October to December and the flowers are white.

Taxonomy and naming
Eucalyptus planchoniana was first formally described in 1878 by Ferdinand von Mueller in Fragmenta phytographiae Australiae from material collected from near Moreton Bay by Frederick Manson Bailey. The specific epithet honours Jules Emile Planchon.

Distribution and habitat
Needlebark stringbark grows in open forest on low ridges and gentle slopes from Moreton Island and Stradbroke Island in Queensland to Camden Haven in coastal New South Wales and as far inland as the Gibraltar Range National Park.

References

planchoniana
Myrtales of Australia
Flora of New South Wales
Flora of Queensland
Trees of Australia
Taxa named by Ferdinand von Mueller
Plants described in 1878